The Binyaminu Usman Polytechnic is a state government higher education institution located in Hadejia, Jigawa State, Nigeria. The current Rector is Zilkifulu Abdu.

History 
The Binyaminu Usman Polytechnic was established in 1992.

Courses 
The institution offers the following courses;

 Fisheries Technology
 Forestry Technology
 Horticultural Technology
 Production Tech
 Computer Engineering
 Wildlife and Eco-Tourism
 Electrical/Electronic Engineering Technology
 Business Administration and Management
 Computer Science
 Home and Rural Economics
 Agricultural Technology
 Animal Health And Production Technology
 Statistics

References 

Universities and colleges in Nigeria
1992 establishments in Nigeria